Domeykite is a copper arsenide mineral, Cu3As. It crystallizes in the isometric system, although crystals are very rare. It typically forms as irregular masses or botryoidal forms. It is an opaque, white to gray (weathers brassy) metallic mineral with a Mohs hardness of 3 to 3.5 and a specific gravity of 7.2 to 8.1

It was first described in 1845 in the Algodones mines, Coquimbo, Chile. It was named after Polish mineralogist Ignacy Domeyko (1802–1889) by Wilhelm Haidinger.

Uses 
Domeykite, being a minor copper ore is used for obtaining copper. It can also be polished and used for ornamental purposes.

See also
List of minerals
List of minerals named after people

References

Copper(I) minerals
Arsenide minerals
Cubic minerals
Minerals in space group 220